Maroochydore Road (state route 8) is a major arterial road on the Sunshine Coast, Queensland that connects the major town/urban centre of Maroochydore with the Bruce Highway.

Route description
Maroochydore Road is a 9.8 km, 4 lane state controlled road on the Sunshine Coast that connects Maroochydore with the Bruce Highway, the region's main connection to Brisbane, Queensland's state capital. Maroochydore Road begins at the intersection of Beach Road and Horton Parade (state route 6) in the Maroochydore CBD and travels west providing an interchange with the Sunshine Motorway (state route 70) and through the town of Kuluin. Maroochydore Road terminates at the intersection with the Bruce Highway in Forest Glen but the road itself continues as Nambour Connection Road, a state controlled road that leads to Nambour.

Upgrades

Improve intersection
A project to improve the intersection at the eastern end of the road, at a cost of $1.861 million, was to be completed by early 2022.

Kunda Park intersection improvements
A project to improve an intersection at Kunda Park was in the planning stage in November 2021.

Major intersections
The entire road is in the Sunshine Coast local government area.

References

Roads in Queensland
Sunshine Coast Region